Franco Raúl González (born 7 March 1999) is an Argentine professional footballer who plays as a midfielder for Deportivo Merlo.

Career
González was produced by the Godoy Cruz academy. He was promoted into senior football in May 2019 by manager Lucas Bernardi, who selected the midfielder to start a Copa de la Superliga second leg, round of sixteen encounter against Boca Juniors at La Bombonera; featuring, aged twenty, for seventy-nine minutes as the club were eliminated 5–2 on aggregate.

Career statistics
.

References

External links

1999 births
Living people
Sportspeople from Mendoza Province
Argentine footballers
Association football midfielders
Godoy Cruz Antonio Tomba footballers
Gimnasia y Esgrima de Mendoza footballers
Deportivo Merlo footballers
Argentine Primera División players
Primera Nacional players
Primera B Metropolitana players